Jaroslav Navrátil and Tom Nijssen were the defending champions but did not compete that year.

Udo Riglewski and Tobias Svantesson won in the final 6–4, 6–7, 7–6 against João Cunha e Silva and Eduardo Masso.

Seeds
Champion seeds are indicated in bold text while text in italics indicates the round in which those seeds were eliminated.

 Claudio Mezzadri /  Claudio Panatta (first round)
 Menno Oosting /  Johan Vekemans (quarterfinals)
 Udo Riglewski /  Tobias Svantesson (champions)
 Steve Guy /  Olli Rahnasto (first round)

Draw

External links
 1989 Lorraine Open Doubles Draw

1989 Grand Prix (tennis)